Richard "Dick" McKee (Irish name Risteárd Mac Aoidh; 4 April 1893 – 21 November 1920) was a prominent member of the Irish Republican Army (IRA). He was also friend to some senior members in the republican movement, including Éamon de Valera, Austin Stack and Michael Collins. Along with Peadar Clancy and Conor Clune, he was killed by his captors  in Dublin Castle on Sunday, 21 November 1920, a day known as Bloody Sunday that also saw the killing of a network of British spies by the "Squad" unit of the Irish Republican Army and the killing of 14 people in Croke Park by the Royal Irish Constabulary (RIC).

Early life
McKee was born at Phibsborough Road in Dublin on 4 April 1893. He became an apprentice in the publishing business at Gill & Son, Upper O'Connell Street, and then a compositor.

Paramilitary career
McKee joined the Irish Volunteers in 1913, serving in G Company, Second Battalion of the Dublin Brigade. He served in the 1916 Rising in Jacob's Factory, under the command of Thomas MacDonagh. McKee was later incarcerated by the British Army in Knutsford Gaol and at the Frongoch internment camp in Wales.

McKee was promoted within the IRA shortly after his release. He became Company Captain and then Commandant of the Second Battalion, eventually being placed as Brigadier of the Army's Dublin Brigade. He was also active as an ex-officio member of IRA General Headquarters Staff - which included Collins, Richard Mulcahy and Russell. He was a prime innovator in the formation of the flying columns along with Mulcahy and Collins. He was Director of Training for this duration, though he was jailed again as a political prisoner in Dundalk Jail, in 1918.

McKee had many escapes and close shaves during the Anglo-Irish War - arms raid on Collinstown Aerodrome (now Dublin Airport) in which his unit captured 75 rifles and approximately 15,000 rounds of ammunition and the Kings Inns raid in which his unit captured 25 rifles, two Lewis guns and several thousand rounds of ammunition. In the final chapter of his revolutionary activism, he was on full-time active service, moving covertly through a network of safe houses.

He was engaged to May Gibney, a volunteer during the Easter Rising and an active member of Cumann na mBan.

The Squad
In July 1919 Collins asked McKee to select a small group of men to form the Squad. McKee was intimately involved in the planning of Bloody Sunday 1920 which was a day of violence in Dublin on 21 November 1920, during the Irish War of Independence. More than 30 people were killed or fatally wounded which included twenty British intelligence agents at eight different locations in Dublin.

Arrest and death

McKee was betrayed to Crown forces by an ex-British Army soldier, James "Shankers" Ryan, and captured at Sean Fitzpatrick's before Bloody Sunday by the Royal Irish Constabulary. (In retaliation, on 5 February 1921, an IRA squad led by Bill Stapleton walked into Hynes' pub in Gloucester Place and shot Ryan dead.)

Brought to Dublin Castle he was tortured under interrogation with Peadar Clancy and Conor Clune from County Clare. The three would later be shot on 21 November 1920. The official account was that he and the other men with him were shot while trying to escape. This account was widely disputed at the time, although some historians believe it was actually true. Michael Lynch, a IRA Brigade Commander stated that McKee suffered severe beatings prior to being shot to death - "I saw Dick McKee's body afterwards, and it was almost unrecognizable. He had evidently been tortured before being shot...They must have beaten Dick to a pulp. When they threatened him with death, according to reports, Dick's last words were, "Go on, and do your worst!" Medical examinations of the three bodies revealed broken bones and abrasions consistent with prolonged assaults and bullet wounds to the head and bodies. 

A book titled Death in the Castle: Three murders in Dublin Castle 1920, written by Sean O'Mahony, and published by 1916–1921 Club records both the life and deaths of the three Republicans.

Burial
McKee and Clancy's tricolour-adorned coffins lay side by side at St. Mary's Pro-Cathedral on Marlborough Street, Dublin. Aged 27 and 32 years, respectively, they were laid to rest at the Republican Plot in Glasnevin Cemetery.

McKee Barracks in Dublin is named after Dick McKee.

Gallery

References

1920 deaths
Burials at Glasnevin Cemetery
Irish Republican Army (1919–1922) members
People from County Dublin
Irish Republicans killed during the Irish War of Independence
1893 births